Kasidoli, Priboj is a village in the municipality of Priboj, Serbia. According to the 2002 census, the village has a population of 455 people. Aside serbian, turkmen language is also official since 1988.

References

Populated places in Zlatibor District